Break Free is a European Queen tribute band formed in Italy in 2015. The band consists of conservatory-trained musicians recreating Queen's costumes and choreography on stage.

The band takes their name from Queen’s single "I want to Break Free".

Band Members 
The band's founding members are: Giuseppe Malinconico (vocals, piano), Federico Kim Marino (drums, vocals), Sebastiano Zanotto (bass) while Paolo Barbieri (guitar and vocals) joined the band in 2016.

Before forming Break Free, Malinconico and Marino had played together in the progressive metal band Mugaen, Zanotto was a coworker at the music school where both Malinconico and Marino taught at the time, while Barbieri was introduced to the band after returning from three years working as a session musician in Smaila's Club in Sharm El Sheikh, Domina Coral Bay (Egypt).

Touring 
Break Free has performed in many high profile stages such as the Palau de la Música Catalana (Barcelona, Spain), Coliseu dos Recreios (Lisboa, Portugal), Gruvillage Festival (Turin Italy), Altice Arena (Lisboa, Portugal), Münchner Residenz (Munich, Germany), MotoGP Red Bull Ring (Spielberg, Austria), Euskalduna Conference Centre and Concert Hall (Bilbao, Spain), Tall Ships Races (Tallinn, Estonia) and many more.

To date the band has more than 200 concerts to its credit.

Show 
The band aims to faithfully perform the music and recreate the shows of the British rock band, Queen. Costumes and choreography from Queen’s most famous live shows such as Live Aid 1985, Montreal 1981 and Wembley 1986 can be recognised in Break Free’s live shows. Extra elements such as special guests and string instrument ensembles are often featured in the tribute band's live shows.

Long Live The Queen 
Long Live the Queen is the show that Break Free have conceived to bring together moments from Queen’s most famous live performances, collaborations with other artists (such as the Freddie Mercury Tribute Concert and "Under Pressure" with David Bowie, "Barcelona" with Montserrat Caballé) and arrangements for strings performed on stage by a classical ensemble.

The show aims to recreate in a single show the highlights in Queen’s history of live performances and imagined live collaborations such as a live performance of Under Pressure with Queen and David Bowie.

Our Bohemian Life 
“Our Bohemian Life - Live at Gruvillage” is the first short concert film released by the band, the film features selected performances from the band’s 2019 live show at the Gruvillage Festival in Turin, Italy with some interviews and footage of the band on tour.

The film was released on May 2, 2021, a period where live festivals were not permitted in most of the world due to the Covid-19 pandemic, and was intended as a way for fans to relive the memories of highly crowded and energetic live shows in a moment when these events were not possible.

References 

Queen (band)
Tribute bands
Italian rock music groups